The 1917 Marshall Thundering Herd football team represented Marshall College (now Marshall University) in the 1917 college football season. Marshall posted a 1–7–1 record, being outscored by its opposition 7–345.  Home games were played on a campus field called "Central Field" which is presently Campus Commons.

Schedule

References

Marshall
Marshall Thundering Herd football seasons
Marshall Thundering Herd football